Horizon Football Club is a Myanmar football club, founded in 2012. Originating from Horizon International Schools, the team switched to full Professional Club status and contested the MNL-2. At the end of the 2015 MNL-2, they won promotion to the Myanmar National League.

Current players

2016
The squad for the 2016 Myanmar National League.

Former players

  Eze Chika Philip

References
 Horizon Website in Burmese

External links
 First Eleven Journal in Burmese
 Soccer Myanmar in Burmese

Football clubs in Myanmar
Association football clubs established in 2009
Myanmar National League clubs
2009 establishments in Myanmar